Jeffrey Paul Brownschidle (March 1, 1959 - December 13, 1996) was an American ice hockey defenseman who played three games in the NHL for the Hartford Whalers during the 1981-82 NHL season and another four games in the 1982-83 NHL season. He also played in the American Hockey League for the Binghamton Whalers and the Central Hockey League for the Binghamton Whalers. His brother Jack Brownschidle also played in the NHL, played 494 games for the St. Louis Blues and the Hartford Whalers.

He was killed in a car accident on December 13, 1996.

Career statistics

Regular season and playoffs

International

External links
 
 

1959 births
1996 deaths
American men's ice hockey defensemen
Binghamton Whalers players
Hartford Whalers players
Ice hockey people from Buffalo, New York
Notre Dame Fighting Irish men's ice hockey players
Road incident deaths in New York (state)
Salt Lake Golden Eagles (CHL) players
Undrafted National Hockey League players